Josephine Musser is a former political candidate in Wisconsin. Musser was a candidate for the United States House of Representatives from Wisconsin's 2nd congressional district in 1998, losing to Tammy Baldwin. She is a Republican.

References

Wisconsin Republicans
Candidates in the 1998 United States elections
20th-century American politicians
Living people
Year of birth missing (living people)